Greenlawn Cemetery is a historic cemetery and national historic district located at Franklin, Johnson County, Indiana. It is a landscape-lawn style cemetery established in 1845, and contains roughly 15,000 burials.  Located in the cemetery is a small Gothic Revival style chapel (1878, now cemetery office) and the Romanesque Revival Main Mausoleum (1911).

Notable burials at Greenlawn include US Congressman William W. Wick (1796–1868), Governor Roger D. Branigin (1902–1975), Mayor Lemuel Ertus Slack (1874–1952), and Hall of Fame basketball player Fuzzy Vandivier (1903–1983).

It was listed on the National Register of Historic Places in 2013.

References

External links
 

Cemeteries on the National Register of Historic Places in Indiana
1845 establishments in Indiana
Gothic Revival architecture in Indiana
Romanesque Revival architecture in Indiana
Historic districts in Johnson County, Indiana
National Register of Historic Places in Johnson County, Indiana